Sabae City's  is a small zoo in the city of Sabae, Fukui Prefecture, Japan. The admission-free municipal zoo is on a low hill (Nishiyama Park). It is known for its red pandas; the species is the official animal of the city.

Despite its small size, the zoo is home to one of the largest groups of red pandas in Japan: 11 individuals . They are descendants of a pair donated by the Beijing Zoo in 1984. The founding couple arrived at the Nishiyama Zoo before it officially opened the following year (though the enclosures were ready). The youngest pandas now belong to the seventh generation.

The Beijing Zoo later donated red-crowned cranes (1985), François' langur (1987), and lar gibbons (1991) to the zoo. Other zoo residents include black squirrel monkeys, pheasants, Japanese cranes and peafowls.

It is about 0.5 km from both Nishi-Sabae Station (in the south) and Nishiyama-Kōen Station (in the east). It opens at 9 am and closes at 4:30 pm daily, except Mondays (closed).

References

External links
  

Zoos in Japan
Zoos established in 1985
1985 establishments in Japan
Tourist attractions in Fukui Prefecture
Sabae, Fukui